B67 may refer to :
 List of Torchwood items#Amnesia pill
 B67 (New York City bus) in Brooklyn
 Encyclopaedia of Chess Openings code for one of the listed variations of the Richter-Rauzer Attack
 HLA-B67, an HLA-B serotype
 Bundesstraße 67, a German road

B-67 may refer to :
 B-67, a sports club based in Nuuk in Greenland